is the tenth single by Japanese singer Yōko Oginome. Written by Masao Urino and Akihiro Yoshimi, the single was released on October 29, 1986 by Victor Entertainment.

Background and release
"Roppongi Junjōha" peaked at No. 3 on Oricon's singles chart, making it Oginome's highest-charting single until "Sayonara no Kajitsutachi" hit No. 1 in 1987. It also sold over 261,000 copies. The song earned Oginome the Gold Award at the 29th Japan Record Awards, the Best Hit Song Award at the 1987 FNS Music Festival, and the Wired Music Award at the 20th Japan Cable Awards. Oginome performed the song on the 38th Kōhaku Uta Gassen in 1986, making her second appearance on NHK's New Year's Eve special. In addition to Oginome's achievements for the song, songwriter Akihiro Yoshimi won the Outstanding Composer Award for this song at the 20th Japan Composition Awards.

The B-side, "Romantic Odyssey", was used as the theme song of the Famicom game .

Oginome re-recorded the song in her 2014 cover album Dear Pop Singer.

Track listing

Charts
Weekly charts

Year-end charts

Cover versions
 Priscilla Chan covered the song in Cantonese as "Tān, tān, tān" (貪、貪、貪, lit. "Greed, Greed, Greed") on her 1987 album Biàn biàn biàn (變變變, lit. Change, Change, Change).
 The Nolans covered the song in English as "Roppongi Street" on their 1991 album Tidal Wave (Samishii Nettaigyo).
 Ms. Ooja covered the song on her 2022 cover album Nagashi no Ooja 2: Vintage Song Covers.

References

External links

1986 singles
Yōko Oginome songs
Japanese-language songs
Songs with lyrics by Masao Urino
Victor Entertainment singles